Maggie O'Kane is an Irish journalist and documentary film maker. She has been most associated with The Guardian newspaper where she was a foreign correspondent who filed graphic stories from Sarajevo while it was under siege between 1992 and 1996. She also contributed to the BBC from Bosnia. She has been editorial director of GuardianFilms, the paper's film unit, since 2004. Since 2017, she has been chair of the Board of the European Press Prize.

Education
O'Kane received her secondary education at Loreto Convent, Balbriggan, County Dublin, Ireland at the College of Commerce (now DIT) where she completed a journalism diploma. She received a B.A. degree in Politics and History at University College Dublin before studying at the Institut des Journalistes en Europe in Paris.

Career
From 1982 to 1984, O'Kane worked for the Sunday Tribune in Dublin and then in 1984 to 1989 for RTÉ. She then covered Eastern Europe as a freelance journalist contributing to The Economist, The Sunday Times, The Guardian, The Irish Times and Mail on Sunday. From 1992 to 1996, she covered the Bosnian War for The Guardian. Since 2003 she has been the editorial director for Guardian Films.<ref>[http://www.buzzle.com/editorials/11-7-2003-47360.asp/ Maggie O'Kane: Bringing the Guardian's Ethos to TV, Buzzle.com, 11 July 2003] .Retrieved on 19 July 2007.</ref> 

In its first three years, the company made 30 films – mostly for television – including the Baghdad Blogger reports, featuring Baghdad resident  'Salam Pax'  – whose blog Where is Raed? was printed in The Guardian and New York Times during the occupation of his city. They were shown on BBC Two's Newsnight programme. Some of these were also shown in 2007 in two collections by CNN International.

Kane was also reporter in Sex on the Streets, made by GuardianFilms for the UK's Channel 4 television channel. It focussed on violence against women working as prostitutes. She was also reporter in the company's Spiked – also for Channel 4 – about the use date rape drugs. In the first half of 2007, GuardianFilms won two Amnesty International awards and a RTS award for its Iraq coverage.

On 15 March 2013, it was reported by the Real News Network that O'Kane had just finished producing a documentary for GuardianFilms on the investigation of the war crimes committed in Iraq on behalf of the Bush Administration, focusing on the roles played in the trickle-down military system. She argues, through her documentary, that the United States army, to quell Sunni rebellion and insurgency, armed and funded national, radical Shia militants to aid them in quelling Sunni insurgency. Subsequently, this Shia "police force" came to number approximately 12,000 men and are reported to have acted as, not containment forces, but as death squads, their killings reaching 3,000 per month at their height.

Awards
 1992 UK Journalist of the Year
 1993 Amnesty International UK Media Awards with Ed Vulliamy, The Guardian for reports from Yugoslavia.  
 1996 James Cameron Memorial Trust Award for Journalism,
 1999 Shortlisted, Amnesty International UK Media Awards; Shortlisted as Feature Writer of the Year at the British Press Awards 2002: European Journalist of the Year''
 2018: 'Irish Red Cross journalism excellence award'

References

External links
GuardianFilms Website
Guardian biography of O'Kane
British Film Institute filmography to 2004
Baghdad Blogger Salam Pax: Part 1 on CNN International, April 11, 2007
Baghdad Blogger Salam Pax: Part 2 on CNN International, April 17, 2007
mp4 video excerpt from one of "Salam Pax"'s Baghdad Blogger films
mp4 video excerpt from Chernobyl: The Last Generation – executive producer: O'Kane

Year of birth missing (living people)
Living people
Irish women journalists
BBC newsreaders and journalists
RTÉ newsreaders and journalists
Sunday Tribune people
The Guardian journalists
The Irish Times people
British women television journalists
Irish radio presenters
Irish women radio presenters